

This is a list of the National Register of Historic Places listings in Rice County, Kansas.

This is intended to be a complete list of the properties and districts on the National Register of Historic Places in Rice County, Kansas, United States. The locations of National Register properties and districts for which the latitude and longitude coordinates are included below may be seen on a map. There are 15 properties and districts listed on the National Register in the county, including 1 National Historic Landmark and two former listings.

Current listings

|}

Former listings

|}

See also

 List of National Historic Landmarks in Kansas
 National Register of Historic Places listings in Kansas

References

Rice